The Konya tram is a tram system located in Konya city of Turkey. Konya's first tram line was opened on April 15, 1992. The system is 41 km long with two lines and has 41 stations. The tram is among the most heavily used in Turkey.

History
In 1987, the Konya Metropolitan Municipality announced plans for a new light rail network in order to provide safe, cheap and fast transportation to citizens of the city. Construction of the first phase of Line One began in 1987. After 5 years of construction work, the Alaaddin-Republic line was opened for public use. In 1996, this line was extended to the northern district of Selcuklu and Selcuk University. In 2015, the Alaaddin-Adliye line was put into service.

Operation
The Konya Tram operates two lines. The Konya Metropolitan Municipality is construction an underground rail system the Konya Metro. The Metro will connect with the tram at Meram Beledeysi and Konya Railway Station. The Konya Tram carries an average of 104,000 riders daily. The tram operates between 6:00 and 24:00 every day of the year.

Lines

Line One
Line One of the Konya Tram runs south to north from the center of Konya to the northern suburbs of the city known as Selçuklu. The line terminates in the north at the campus of Selçuk University. The line consists of 34 stations, runs 36.7 km and was opened for use in two phases. Phase one opened in 1992 and phase two opened in 1999. Transfers between Lines One and Two are available at Zafer and Alaaddin in Konya's City Center.

Line Two
Line Two of the Konya Tram runs east to west through the center of Konya. The tram connects Zafer in the west to suburban Arifbey in the east. The line consists of 9 stations, runs 4.4 km and was opened for use in 2015. Transfers between Lines One and Two are available at Zafer and Alaaddin.

Gallery

References

External links
 Official site 

Konya
Tram transport in Turkey
Konya